The SPH-i700 is a Windows Mobile-powered smartphone manufactured by Samsung of Korea.  It is a powerful and expandable second generation Pocket PC phone compared to others in its class.  It includes a transflective display, a VGA camera, 300 MHz Processor and supports SDIO, making it a competent PDA. It includes a complete bundle of accessories, including: a case, stereo headset-mic, cradle and both a regular and extended battery. The wireless radio was reported to get strong signals, and offered good voice quality and fast data speeds on Verizon's Express Network. The unit runs the Pocket PC 2002 Phone Edition OS, and in July 2004, Verizon started shipping units running Windows Mobile 2003 Phone Edition.  Windows Mobile 2003 Phone Edition offers the same improvements found in regular Pocket PCs running this OS: improved Pocket Internet Explorer, always on networking, an improved networking connection manager and overall speed improvements.  Samsung makes a similar model called the SGH-i700 which is identical to the SPH-i700 except for it works on the GSM/GPRS network.

Specs 
 Display: Backlit, 240 x 320 pixel color transflective display with 65,000 colors.
 Performance: 300 MHz PXA 250 Intel XScale processor. 64 megabytes of RAM with ~60 available to the user. 5 megs of flash storage available. 64 megs ROM which is flash upgradeable. 
 Size: 5.2" x 2.8" x .6". 6.9 oz.
 Audio: Two Built in speakers (one for system sound and one for phone). Integrated microphone and speakerphone. Supports alarm sounds, LED alert and vibrating alerts. Windows Media Player for MP3s, and has a 2.5mm stereo 3 ring headset. 
 Expansion: 1 SD slot supporting SDIO that accepts SD and MMC cards as well as SDIO cards.
 Battery: Comes with a 1200 mAh rechargeable Lithium Ion battery AND an extended 2,000 mAh battery. User replaceable.
 Software: Pocket PC 2002 Phone Edition operating system (Windows Mobile 2003 shipped on phones made after July 2004 and an upgrade is available for 2002 models). Microsoft Pocket Office suite including Pocket Word, Excel, Internet Explorer, MS Reader and Outlook. Also, Terminal Services, MSN Instant Messenger for Pocket PC and Voice Recorder as well as handwriting recognition. ActiveSync and Outlook for the desktop. 3rd party and additional software: Pocket Backup, Voice Signal, and camera application. 
 Network: CDMA supporting 1xRTT for data. Service provided by Verizon Wireless in the US. Dual band (CDMA 800/1900 MHz). No analog. 
 In the Box: CDs, manual, phone, cradle, case, regular and extended battery, world charger, stereo headset microphone with call send/end button and 2 styli.

External links

Support 
 Samsung.com

I700
Windows Mobile Professional devices
Mobile phones introduced in 2002
Mobile phones with infrared transmitter